Madhuca hirtiflora is a plant in the family Sapotaceae. The specific epithet hirtiflora means "hairy flowers".

Description
Its bark is greyish brown. Inflorescences bear up to six flowers.

Distribution and habitat
Madhuca hirtiflora is native to Sumatra, Peninsular Malaysia and Borneo. Its habitat is lowland mixed dipterocarp forest from  altitude.

Conservation
Madhuca hirtiflora has been assessed as vulnerable on the IUCN Red List. The species is threatened by logging and conversion of land for palm oil plantations.

References

hirtiflora
Trees of Sumatra
Trees of Peninsular Malaysia
Trees of Borneo
Plants described in 1923